Canada competed at the 1952 Summer Olympics in Helsinki, Finland. 107 competitors, 97 men and 10 women, took part in 74 events in 13 sports.

Medalists

Gold
 George Genereux – Shooting, men's trap

Silver
 Kenneth Lane and Donald Hawgood – Canoeing, men's C-2 10000 m
 Gerry Gratton – Weightlifting, men's 67.5–75 kg (middleweight)

Athletics

Basketball

Men's team competition
Qualification round (Group C)
 Defeated Italy (68-57)
 Defeated Romania (72-51)
 Defeated Egypt (63-57)
Main round (group C)
 Lost to Brazil (55-57)
 Lost to Argentina (81-82)
 Lost to Philippines (65-81) → did not advance, 13th place
Team roster
Ralph Campbell
William Coulthard
James Curren
Charles Dalton
William Pataky
Glen Pettinger
Robert Phibbs
Bernard Pickell
(John) Carl Ridd
Robert Simpson
Harry Wade
George Wearring
Roy Williams

Boxing

Men's Light Welterweight (–63,5 kg)
 Roy Keenan
 First round – lost to Piet van Klaveren (Netherlands) on points (1-2)

Men's featherweight (–57 kg)
 Leonard Walters
 First round – defeated Salah El Din Ahmed Fathi (Egypt) on points (3-0)
 Second round – defeated Willi Roth (Germany) on points (2-1)
 Quarterfinals – lost to Leonard John Leisching (South Africa) on points (0-3)

Men's lightweight (–60 kg)
 Clayton Kenny
 First round – defeated Niels Erik Berthelsen (Denmark) on technical knock-out in third round
 Second round – lost to István Juhász (Hungary) on points (1-2)

Men's welterweight (–67 kg)
 Jacob Butula
 First round – bye
 Second round – lost to Ron Norris (India) on technical knock-out in third round

Men's Light Middleweight (–71 kg)
 Charles Chase
 First round – defeated Andre Oueillé (France) on points (2-1)
 Second round – lost to László Papp (Hungary) on knock-out in second round

Men's middleweight (–75 kg)
 Robert Malouf
 First round – bye
 Second round – lost to Leen Jansen (Netherlands) on technical knock-out in first round

Men's Heavyweight (> 91 kg)
 James Saunders
 First round – bye
 Second round – lost to Giacomo di Segni (Italy) on points (0-3)

Canoeing

Cycling

Track Competition
Men's 1.000m Time Trial
Frederick Henry
 Final – 1:17.6 (→ 22nd place)

Men's 1.000m Sprint Scratch Race
John Millman – 8th place

Equestrian

Fencing

Two fencers, both men, represented Canada in 1952.

Men's foil
 Edward Brooke
 Roland Asselin

Men's épée
 Edward Brooke
 Roland Asselin

Men's sabre
 Roland Asselin

Rowing

Canada had 15 male rowers participate in three out of seven rowing events in 1952.

 Men's double sculls
 Bob Williams
 Derek Riley

 Men's coxless four
 Ron Cameron
 Lloyd Montour
 Jack Zwirewich
 Art Griffiths

 Men's eight
 Ted Chilcott
 Jack Taylor
 Bo Westlake
 Frank Young
 John Sharp
 Mervin Kaye
 Jack Russell
 George McCauley
 Norm Rowe (cox)

Sailing

Shooting

Four shooters represented Canada in 1952. George Genereux won a gold medal in the trap event.

25 m pistol
 Edson Warner

300 m rifle, three positions
 Gil Boa

50 m rifle, three positions
 Gil Boa
 Edson Warner

50 m rifle, prone
 Gil Boa
 Edson Warner

Trap
 George Genereux
 Roy Cole

Swimming

Weightlifting

Wrestling

References

Nations at the 1952 Summer Olympics
1952
Summer Olympics